Gonothyraea is a genus of cnidarians belonging to the family Campanulariidae.

The genus has cosmopolitan distribution.

Species:
 Gonothyraea inornata Nutting, 1901
 Gonothyraea loveni (Allman, 1859)

References

Campanulariidae
Hydrozoan genera